Group C of UEFA Euro 2012 began on 10 June 2012 and ended on 18 June 2012. The pool consisted of Spain, Italy, Republic of Ireland and Croatia. The group was jokingly dubbed the "group of debt" by multiple media outlets, in reference to the European sovereign debt crisis facing some of its members. Spain and Italy progressed to the quarter-finals, while Croatia and Republic of Ireland were eliminated from the tournament. Republic of Ireland equalled the worst performance by a team in the group stage of the European Championships, finishing with no points and a goal difference of −8. Both Spain and Italy made it through the quarter-finals and semi-finals to reach the final for a second meeting in the tournament.

In their final match, the Republic of Ireland wore black armbands to commemorate the 18th anniversary of the Loughinisland massacre. This was criticised by some unionists and members of the UVF. However, the victims' families fully supported the gesture.

Teams

Notes

Standings

In the quarter-finals,
The winner of Group C, Spain, advanced to play the runner-up of Group D, France.
The runner-up of Group C, Italy, advanced to play the winner of Group D, England.

Matches

Spain vs Italy

Republic of Ireland vs Croatia

Italy vs Croatia

Spain vs Republic of Ireland

Croatia vs Spain

Italy vs Republic of Ireland

References

External links
UEFA Euro 2012 Group C

Group C
Group
Group
Group
Croatia at UEFA Euro 2012